For the river which flows into the River Ogwen see Afon Llafar.
The Afon Llafar is a small river in North Wales which, rising on the eastern slopes of Arenig Fawr, flows south-east through the hamlet of Parc and into Bala Lake (Welsh: Llyn Tegid). It is within the Dee catchment.

References 

Llanycil
Llanuwchllyn
Rivers of Gwynedd
Rivers of Snowdonia